Locomotive SFAI 1400 was a small 0-4-0 tank locomotive built in 1870 for the Società per le strade ferrate dell'Alta Italia (SFAI) by Cockerill of Seraing.

History
It was originally used by the construction company of the Fréjus Rail Tunnel for the haulage of works trains. On completion of the work in 1871, it passed to the SFAI, which numbered it 1400. In 1885, when the great national networks were created, the locomotive passed to the Rete Mediterranea, where it took the number 5101. In 1905, on the nationalization of the railways, it entered the stock of the Ferrovie dello Stato (FS), which placed it in Class 800 with the number 8001. Curiously, the other engine in the class, 8002, was completely different, being a more powerful engine with a separate tender.

References

Further reading
    Giovanni Cornolò, Locomotive a vapore FS, Parma, Ermanno Albertelli, 1998, pp. 426–428. 

0-4-0T locomotives
Railway locomotives introduced in 1870
Standard gauge locomotives of Italy
Rete Mediterranea steam locomotives